Baekseok station, also known as National Health Insurance Service Ilsan Hospital station, is a subway station served by the Ilsan Line of the Seoul Metropolitan Subway system. The station is located in the Ilsan ward in Goyang, Gyeonggi Province, South Korea. There are many stores and restaurants close to the station, including a Costco store.

Station layout

References 

Seoul Metropolitan Subway stations
Railway stations opened in 1996
Metro stations in Goyang
Seoul Subway Line 3